Torrini is a Florentine company of goldsmiths located in the Piazza del Duomo. Founded in 1369, it is arguably the oldest jeweler firm in the world.

History 
Torrini's trademark was registered in 1369 with the Blacksmiths, Armourers Guild of the Florentine Republic by Jacopus Turini Della Scharperia (or Scarperia). In the State Archives of Florence, there are still indelible traces of the registration that the member of the Goldsmith Lineage did with a signum (the legend says a half-clover with a spur) that is still used today to seal the firm's works.

The production of jewelry and artworks is being taught from father to son. Some examples of these works, dating back to members of the Torrini Goldsmith Family, have ended up in museums around the world. For instance, Giovanni di Turino's (or Turini) Madonna and Child at the National Gallery of Art Detroit Institute of Arts in the USA; and the Virgin with Child at the Metropolitan Museum of Art in Washington, DC; or the nineteenth-most recent set of Giocondo Torrini at the British Museum in London: an example of a Florentine hard stone inlay while another exists at the RISD Museum in Providence (US).

The museum 
The museum bears witness to the secular activities of the Torrini Goldsmith Lineage with its seventeenth-century history.
Among the museum, works are rare examples of Renaissance silverware, a group of eighteenth-century brooches, and some nineteenth-century brooches made of semiprecious stones. They are periodically organized in via traveling exhibitions devoted to monographic issues or particular artists.

See also 
 List of oldest companies

References

External links
 official website

Jewellery companies of Italy
Watch manufacturing companies of Italy
Companies established in the 14th century
Manufacturing companies based in Florence
Museums in Florence
Italian goldsmiths
Italian brands
14th-century establishments in the Republic of Florence